Rubye De Remer (born Ruby Burkhard; January 9, 1892 – March 18, 1984) was an American dancer and actress in silent films. She began her stage career with the Midnight Frolic, a Florenz Ziegfeld show, in New York City.

Film actress

Her first film role came in 1917 in Enlighten Thy Daughter, a picture directed by Ivan Abramson. The Fox Film comedy, The Evil Eye (1920), starred De Remer, Catherine Calvert and Eugene O'Brien. As Christine, in Pilgrims of the Night (1921), she played a hand organ while a monkey on a leash accompanied her through the streets of New York City. She worked for Associated Producers, acting opposite Lewis Stone in a number of films. One of these was Passersby, a Frothingham production, adapted from the E. Phillips Oppenheim novel. Among her final starring films were three features directed by Marcel Perez: The Way Women Love (1920), Luxury (1921), and Unconquered Woman (1922).

Ideal beauty
French artist Paul Helleu chose De Remer as his ideal of American beauty in 1920. Florenz Ziegfeld called De Remer the most beautiful blonde since Venus.

Marriage
On April 7, 1924, De Remer wed Scranton, Pennsylvania, coal and iron magnate Dr. Benjamin Throop 2nd (1889–1935) in Paris, France. Her husband- she was his second wife- reportedly spent the entire family fortune by the time of his death. De Remer's Hollywood Hills home- Sunkist- was so high above the movie colony that it was said the clouds park right in her front yard.

Filmography

References

Sources

 Davenport Democrat and Leader, "Most Persistent Lover Finally Weds Rubye de Remer", April 8, 1924, page 20.
 Fresno Bee Republican, "New York Day By Day", July 3, 1933, page 24.
 Lima News, "Always Merry But Never Bright", July 27, 1930
 Madison Capitol Times, "Movie Notes", June 14, 1921, page 4.
 Olean Times Herald, "Haven", April 5, 1922, page 4.
 Reno Evening Gazette, "Women Taking Off Too Much She Says", April 7, 1920, page 9.
 Sandusky Star Journal, "Has Noted Artist's Idea of Beauty Changed In 8 Years?", December 7, 1920, page 6.
 Washington Post, "Beauty Often a Handicap", August 3, 1919, page 57.

External links

Rubye De Remer at Virtual History

Actresses from Denver
American film actresses
American silent film actresses
American stage actresses
Vaudeville performers
1892 births
1984 deaths
20th-century American actresses